K11 Art Mall is a seven-storey shopping centre in Tsim Sha Tsui, Hong Kong located in The Masterpiece, developed by New World Development and completed in December 2009. It is near Tsim Sha Tsui and East Tsim Sha Tsui stations.

Layout 
The K11 Art Mall has seven storeys (two underground, five above ground). The B1 and B2 storeys were opened on 27 November 2009, and the rest of the mall was opened on 5 December that year. Retail and restaurants accounted for 80 per cent and 20 per cent of the stores, respectively.

B2 is mainly international cuisine ,women's fashion, shoes and cosmetics, with shops such as D-mop zone, Mousse, ISCOV, JILL SCOTT, Mirabell, and Milan. B1 is mainly daily necessities, including La Creation de Gute bakery, LensCrafters, AV Life, Dymocks bookstore, I Love Kitchen, Mannings, and Market Place by Jasons supermarket.

The ground floor has many high-end stores, including Longchamp, Tiffany by Soloman, Thann, Omega, the Italian brand Dormeuil, Y-3, D-mop, and Chow Tai Fook concept store. In the centre is a large plaza, called "The Piazza", that features a glass ceiling and a large LED screen.

Levels 1–3 have many boutiques, including AIGLE, KLASSE14, Laosmiddle, Levi's, Clarks, Fila, and mademoiselle. The mall also caters to Mainland customers, with several Mainland brand-name specialty stores such as Biba and imaroon.

There are restaurants on each floor of the mall, totaling over 20, including B2's Miso Cool and DALAT Vietnamese restaurant; The Piazza's Espressamente illy and awfully chocolate; and various others, such as AKU Japanese Restaurant, Al Pasha, Cool Gelato, Ginza Bairin and Pak Loh Chiu Chow Restaurant.

See also
 Victoria Dockside – home to K11 Musea, K11 Artus, and K11 Atelier
 K11 (Shanghai)
 K11 Art Foundation
 11 SKIES
 New World Development

References

External links

K11 Shop news

Shopping centres in Hong Kong
New World Development
Tsim Sha Tsui
Hong Kong art